Jewels 3rd Ring, was a mixed martial arts (MMA) event held by promotion Jewels.

Background
Most of the rest of the card was revealed by the end of that month and the order of the bouts was announced shortly before the event.

Results

See also
 Jewels (mixed martial arts)
 2009 in Jewels

References

External links
Official results at Jewels 
Event results at Sherdog
Event results at Fightergirls.com
Event results at Bout Review 
Event results at God Bless the Ring 
Event results at kakutoh.com 
Event results at sportsnavi.com 

Jewels (mixed martial arts) events
2009 in mixed martial arts
Mixed martial arts in Japan
Sports competitions in Tokyo
2009 in Japanese sport